Zari Jamani or Zari Jamni is a town in Wani Subdivision of Yavatmal district in the Indian state of Maharashtra.

References 

Cities and towns in Yavatmal district
Talukas in Maharashtra